Rector election was held at Palacký University on 16 October 2013. Historian Jaroslav Miller defeated the incumbent Rector Miroslav Mašláň.

Candidates
Miroslav Mašláň, the incumbent Rector sought reelection.
Jaroslav Miller, Head at Department of History at the Faculty of Arts. He announced his candidacy on 24 April 2013.

Voting

Aftermath
Miller was appointed by president on 1 February 2014.

Notes

Palacký University Rector election
Palacký University Rector election
Palacký University Olomouc
University and college elections in the Czech Republic
Non-partisan elections